Agustín Maziero (born 27 November 1997) is an Argentine footballer who plays as a forward for Nueva Chicago.

Club career
Born in Luis Palacios, Santa Fe, Maziero joined Rosario Central's youth setup in 2011, from CA El Porvenir del Norte. He made his first team – and Primera División – debut on 26 November 2017, coming on as a late substitute for Marco Ruben in a 1–0 home win against Boca Juniors.

Maziero scored his first professional goal on 16 March 2018, netting a brace in a 3–1 home defeat of Chacarita Juniors.

On 8 February 2020, Maziero signed a one-year contract with Armenian Premier League club Lori FC. However, due to the 2020 Nagorno-Karabakh war between Armenia and Azerbaijan, Maziero left the club in October 2020, to join Sahab SC in Jordan. In July 2021, Maziero returned to Argentina, signing an 18-month long deal with Primera Nacional club Nueva Chicago.

References

External links

1997 births
Living people
Sportspeople from Santa Fe Province
Argentine footballers
Argentine expatriate footballers
Association football forwards
Argentine Primera División players
Primera B de Chile players
Armenian Premier League players
Rosario Central footballers
Magallanes footballers
Sportivo Las Parejas footballers
FC Lori players
Sahab SC players
Nueva Chicago footballers
Argentine expatriate sportspeople in Chile
Argentine expatriate sportspeople in Armenia
Argentine expatriate sportspeople in Jordan
Expatriate footballers in Chile
Expatriate footballers in Armenia
Expatriate footballers in Jordan